is a 2006 Japanese drama film starring Ken Watanabe, Higuchi Kanako and directed by Yukihiko Tsutsumi. The film is based on a novel of the same title published by Hiroshi Ogiwara in 2004.

Plot
The film begins by showing the inevitable outcome of the events of the film: the viewer is shown a scene of a  man who is disabled by Alzheimer's disease, set in the year 2010. The story proper then begins by switching back to an earlier stage in the life of the man, Masayuki Saeki in 2004. Masayuki Saeki is a brilliant and successful advertising company executive. Saeki is shown to be a prime example of an ideal Japanese white-collar worker. He is strict, well organized, hard working, devoted to his job, and sets very high standards for himself and his subordinates. However he is soon shocked to realize that he is failing to meet up to his perfect standards. He starts inexplicably forgetting things - appointments, details of his work, and his knowledge of the layout of Tokyo. Following this he is diagnosed with Alzheimer's disease, to which he reacts with great anger, disbelief and despair. What follows through the rest of the film is a tragic, emotional and very human portrayal of the suffering and the decline of this once powerful, soaring man to that of a pitiful state that resembles a second childhood as the disease wears him down. As the years pass, his memory worsens. He leaves work, and lives at home, where he is cared for by his devoted wife, Emiko. Inevitably, tensions surface between Masayuki and his wife and daughter, and it reaches the point where Emiko's life revolves around taking care of her debilitated husband.

Cast 
 Ken Watanabe - Masayuki Saeki
 Kanako Higuchi - Emiko Saeki
 Kenji Sakaguchi - Naoya Ito
 Kazue Fukiishi - Rie Saeki
 Asami Mizukawa - Keiko Ikuno
 Noritake Kinashi - Shigeyuki Kizaki
 Mitsuhiro Oikawa - Takehiro Yoshida
 Eriko Watanabe - Kimiko Hamano 
 Teruyuki Kagawa - Atsushi Kawamura

Awards
The film received eight awards and four nominations from various sources.

External links
 

Films based on Japanese novels
Films directed by Yukihiko Tsutsumi
Films set in the 21st century
Films about Alzheimer's disease
Films scored by Michiru Ōshima
2000s Japanese films